"...And Justice for All" is a song by American heavy metal band Metallica. It was released as a promotional single in 1988. The song is the second track on the band's album of the same name.

Music and lyrics 
"...And Justice for All" is a long, complex progressive metal composition based on an aggressive riff and a drum pattern by Lars Ulrich. Music critic Cosmo Lee said that it is "a linkage of blocks" rather than "a progressive opus", because "the song is mid-paced and very playable. None of the riffs are that technical."

The song title is the last four words of the Pledge of Allegiance. The lyrics refers to injustice, as "money tips [the] scales" of "Lady Justice". Especially during the chorus, "Pulling your strings, justice is done" as the ultimate symbol of a miscarried justice.

Justice is lost,
Justice is raped,
Justice is gone.

Touring complications 
Due to its complexity, the song was initially only performed live by the band during their 1988 Damaged Justice world tour in support of the album, only making setlists again 19 years later during the Sick of the Studio tour in 2007. However, it is said that the song was played once in 1997 at the Playboy Mansion, with the members swearing to never play it again. As lead guitarist Kirk Hammett would later say in SoWhat! magazine, Justice' was a bit much for me. I couldn't stand watching the front row start to yawn by the eighth or ninth minute." Also, when played live, the intro of the song is played as a recording due to the intro requiring three guitars.

During the Madly in Anger with the World and Escape from the Studio '06 tours, Metallica would often tease the fans by playing parts of the song, with frontman James Hetfield usually saying nobody wants to hear the song. It remained to be seen whether Metallica would ever play the song in its entirety, or play it on a medley, which was the case during the Wherever We May Roam/Nowhere Else to Roam tours in 1991–1993. Then on June 28, 2007, Metallica played "...And Justice for All" in its entirety for the first time since October 1989, nearly 18 years before, in Lisbon, Portugal on the first show of the Sick of the Studio '07 tour.

It was played on the band's headlining set at the new Wembley Stadium on July 8, at Valle Hovin in Norway on July 10, at Stockholms Stadion on July 12, at the Helsinki Olympic Stadium on July 15, at Luzhniki Stadium in Moscow, Russia on July 18, at Skonto Stadium in Riga, Latvia on July 20, at Parco Nord in Bologna, Italy on July 22, in Dublin, Ireland on August 20, at Reading Festival on August 24, and at their performances such as KFMA day at the Pima County Fairgrounds in Tucson, Arizona on May 16, 2008, at the Pengrowth Saddledome in Calgary, Canada on December 4, 2008, at the Prudential Center in Newark, New Jersey on January 31, 2009, at The O2 arena in London on March 28, 2009, and on June 7 at Foro Sol in Mexico City, all four on the World Magnetic Tour and at The Fillmore as part of the 30 Years of Metallica event on December 9, 2011, and on August 17, 2012, in Edmonton, Canada.

A live performance of the complete song appears on the DVD Orgullo, Pasión y Gloria, recorded in Mexico City during the World Magnetic Tour. Though it was featured from the late 2000s to early 2010s, the song has not appeared live since mid-2014.

Track listing

Personnel 
 James Hetfield - vocals, rhythm guitar
 Kirk Hammett - lead guitar
 Lars Ulrich - drums
 Jason Newsted - bass guitar

Video games 
The song is featured in the Metallica 3-Pack that is downloadable content for the music video game Rock Band 3. It was made available to download on March 1, 2011, in an updated version for use in Rock Band 3 Pro mode which takes advantage of the use of a real guitar / bass guitar, along with standard MIDI-compatible electronic drum kits in addition to vocals.

References 

Bibliography
Metallica – The Complete Guide to Their Music, London: Omnibus Press, 2005.

Metallica songs
1988 singles
Songs written by James Hetfield
Songs written by Lars Ulrich
Songs written by Kirk Hammett